The Canadian Meteorological and Oceanographic Society (CMOS) is the national society of individuals and organisations dedicated to advancing atmospheric and oceanic sciences and related environmental disciplines in Canada.

CMOS was officially created in 1967 as the Canadian Meteorological Society, and adopted its present name in 1977, following an invitation by the Canadian Meteorological Society to the oceanographic community in Canada to join the Society. However, CMOS has a rich history dating back to 1939 when it was known as the Canadian Branch of the Royal Meteorological Society. The current president of CMOS is Professor Kimberly Strong.

In 2007, CMOS issued a position statement on global warming:

CMOS endorses the process of periodic climate science assessment carried out by the Intergovernmental Panel on Climate Change and supports the conclusion, in its Third Assessment Report, which states that the balance of evidence suggests a discernible human influence on global climate.

Notable endorsed weathercasters

 Claire Martin - former CBC News Vancouver and Toronto

Awards issued
The Society issues a number of annual awards:
 The President's Prize
 The J.P. Tully Medal in Oceanography
 The Dr. Andrew Thomson Prize in Applied Meteorology 
 The Prize in Applied Oceanography 
 Rube Hornstein Medal in Operational Meteorology
 Roger Daley Postdoctoral Publication Award

The CMOS website presents a list of recipients in past years

See also
Indian-Ocean Rim Association
National Oceanic and Atmospheric Administration

References

External links
 CMOS website
 CMOS-endorsed weathercasters

Meteorological societies
Professional associations based in Canada
Scientific societies based in Canada
Climate of Canada
Oceanographic organizations
1967 establishments in Canada